UFC on ESPN: Overeem vs. Rozenstruik (also known as  UFC on ESPN 7) was a mixed martial arts event produced by the Ultimate Fighting Championship that took place on December 7, 2019 at Capital One Arena in Washington, D.C., United States.

Background
The event was the second that the promotion had contested in the American capital, following UFC Live: Cruz vs. Johnson in October 2011.

The event was also dubbed 'Fight Like Hell Night' and held in honor of the late ESPN broadcaster Stuart Scott, who died from cancer in 2015.

A heavyweight bout between former 2010 K-1 World Grand Prix Champion, Strikeforce Heavyweight Champion and UFC Heavyweight Championship challenger Alistair Overeem and Walt Harris was expected to serve as the event headliner. However on November 1, Harris withdrew from the event due to the ongoing search for his missing stepdaughter, whose remains were found a month after her disappearance. He was replaced by Jairzinho Rozenstruik.

A women's strawweight bout between former UFC Women's Strawweight Championship challenger Cláudia Gadelha and Cynthia Calvillo was scheduled for the event. However on October 22, it was announced that Gadelha was forced to withdraw from the bout due to a broken finger and a torn ligament. She was replaced by Marina Rodriguez.

A women's strawweight bout between Cortney Casey and former Invicta FC Strawweight Champion Virna Jandiroba was scheduled for the event. However, Casey pulled out on October 31 due to undisclosed reasons. She was replaced by another former Invicta FC Strawweight Champion Lívia Renata Souza. In turn, Souza pulled out of the fight a few weeks later and was replaced by promotional newcomer Mallory Martin.

A middleweight bout between Alonzo Menifield and Trevor Smith was scheduled for the event. However on November 10, it was reported that Menifield pulled out of the event for an undisclosed reason and was replaced by Makhmud Muradov.

Mickey Gall was expected to face former WEC Welterweight Champion and interim UFC Welterweight Champion Carlos Condit at the event. However, Condit pulled out on November 13 due to a detached retina and the bout was subsequently canceled.

A featherweight bout between Chris Fishgold and Billy Quarantillo was scheduled for the event. However, Fishgold withdrew from the bout on November 27 for an undisclosed reason. He was replaced by Jacob Kilburn.

At the weigh-ins, Cynthia Calvillo and Matt Sayles missed the required weight for their respective fights. Calvillo weighed in at 120.5 pounds, 4.5 pounds over the strawweight non-title fight limit of 116 pounds. Sayles weighed in at 148.5 pounds, 2.5 pounds over the featherweight non-title fight limit of 146 pounds. Both bouts were held at a catchweight. Calvillo and Sayles were fined 30% and 20% of their purses, which went to their opponents Rodriguez and Mitchell.

Results

Bonus awards
The following fighters received $50,000 bonuses.
Fight of the Night: Rob Font vs. Ricky Simón
Performance of the Night: Bryce Mitchell and Makhmud Muradov

See also 

 List of UFC events
 2019 in UFC
 List of current UFC fighters

References 

UFC on ESPN
2019 in mixed martial arts
Mixed martial arts in Washington, D.C.
Sports competitions in Washington, D.C.
Events in Washington, D.C.